The Ward House is a historic plantation house in Enterprise, Mississippi, USA. It was built for W.A. Ward, a planter from South Carolina. It was designed in the Greek Revival architectural style, and it was completed in 1853. It has been listed on the National Register of Historic Places since May 22, 1980.

References

Houses on the National Register of Historic Places in Mississippi
Greek Revival houses in Mississippi
Houses completed in 1853
Houses in Clarke County, Mississippi
Plantations in Mississippi
National Register of Historic Places in Clarke County, Mississippi